Wague is a surname. Notable people with the surname include:

Georges Wague (1874–1965), French mime, teacher, and actor
Ismaël Wagué, Malian military officer
Mamadou Wague (born 1990), French footballer
Molla Wague (born 1991), Malian footballer
Moussa Wagué (born 1998), Senegalese footballer